Darach Ó Scolaí is an Irish novelist, playwright, publisher, and artist living in the County Galway Gaeltacht of Connemara. He was awarded the Oireachtas Prize for Literature in 2007 for his novel, An Cléireach.

Writing 
His 2007 novel An Cléireach (The Clerk) (pbk ), won the 2007 Oireachtas Prize for Literature, and was published by Leabhar Breac, Inverin. As well as another novel and a number of modern retellings of old Irish tales, he has written and illustrated a number of children's books.

Stage and screen plays 
Two of the author's plays have been produced for the stage, Coinneáil Orainn and An Braon Aníos, and two short screenplays have been filmed, Cosa Nite and An Leabhar. Coinneáil Orainn won the Walter Macken Prize in 2005 and a BBC Stewart Parker Award in 2006. Both Coinneáil Orainn and An Braon Aníos have been published, as well as a prose edition of Cosa Nite. Along with Ciarán Ó Cofaigh he founded the film and television production company Rosg, and was co-director of the company until 2005. In 2006 he founded the stage production company Salamandar, and directed his own play An Braon Aníos.

Publishing 
In 1995 he co-founded the publishing house Leabhar Breac at Inverin (Indreabhán, Co. na Gaillimhe) with his brother, the typographer and designer Caomhán Ó Scolaí. Amongst other titles Leabhar Breac published the 2006 Gradam Uí Shúilleabháin award-winning novel Fontenoy by Liam Mac Cóil, and Seán Mac Mathúna's 2007 novel, Hula Hul.

Art symposium 
In Inis Oirr, along with Val Ballance he co-founded the annual artists' symposium Ealaín ar Oileán, which he now directs. The symposium has been held annually in Áras Éanna, Inis Oírr, since 2004.

Published work 
Súil an Daill, (a novel)  Leabhar Breac 2021.
Na Comharthaí, (a novel) Leabhar Breac 2014
Oileán an Órchiste (a translation of Treasure Island by Robert Louis Stevenson), Leabhar Breac 2000
An Cléireach, (a novel) Leabhar Breac 2007
An Braon Aníos, (a play) Leabhar Breac 2007
Coinneáil Orainn, (a play) Leabhar Breac 2005
An Ceithearnach Caolriabhach (an illustrated retelling of a 15th-century tale), Leabhar Breac 2000
Feis Tigh Chonáin (a retelling of a 16th-century tale), Leabhar Breac 1998

Staged work 
2009: An tSeanbhróg, Salamandar 2009
2008: Craos, Salamandar 2008
2006: An Braon Aníos, Salamandar 2006
2005: Labhraí Loingseach, Fíbín 
2005: Coinneáil Orainn, An Taibhdhearc

Filmed work 
2010: Na Cloigne, dir. Robert Quinn, prod. Ciarán Ó Cofaigh, Rosg 
2001: An Leabhar, dir. Robert Quinn, prod. Ciarán Ó Cofaigh, Rosg 
1999: Cosa Nite, dir. Dearbhla Walsh, prod. Ciarán Ó Cofaigh, Rosg

Documentary work for television 
 1999Na Glúnta, co-directors Ciarán Ó Cofaigh & Darach Ó Scolaí, prod. Ciarán Ó Cofaigh, Rosg

External links 
 Darach Ó Scolaí's website
 Leabhar Breac website
 Ealaín ar Oileán website
 Rosg website
 Bliainiris website
 Salamandar website

Irish novelists
Irish-language writers
People from County Galway
Living people
20th-century Irish people
21st-century Irish people
Year of birth missing (living people)
Irish male novelists